Junab Ali (1 May 1937 - 15 May 1985) was a politician of Bangladesh Nationalist Party. He was elected member of parliament from ex Sylhet-19 seat.

Early life 
Junab Ali was born on 1 May 1937 in Dakshin Jatrapasha mahalla of Baniachang in Habiganj subdivision of Sylhet district in Assam, then British India. In 1953, he passed matriculation from LR High School in Baniachang. He passed IA from Brindaban College, Habiganj in 1955 and BA from the same college in 1957. After that he passed LLB from Dhaka Central Law College.

Political life 
Junab elected member of parliament in second Bangladesh parliamentary election of 1979 as a candidate of Bangladesh Nationalist Party from ex Sylhet-19 seat.

Death 
Junab Ali died on 15 May 1985.

References 

2nd Jatiya Sangsad members
Bangladesh Nationalist Party politicians
People from Habiganj District
1937 births
1985 deaths
Brindaban Government College alumni